The Institut National des Arts de Bamako (INA) is a national school for the arts in Bamako, Mali. It was the only school of its kind in Mali until 2004. Originally set up to train Sudanese artisans, it now offers courses in jewellery making and design, illustration, painting, sculpture, photography, music, and theatre. It has produced many of Mali’s most well-known artists and has hosted numerous exhibitions, workshops, and performances.

Naming 
Over the history of its existence, many changes have affected the institute, including course offerings, faculty, and its name. Since its inception it has been known by many previous names including:
 (1933) Ecole Artisanale du Soudan
 (1948) Maison des artisans du Soudan
 (1963) Institut National des Arts (Law No. 63-98 / ANRM) 
 (1986) Maison des artisans du Mali (Law No. 86-93 / ANRM) 
 (2006) Maison des Artisans de Bamako

Notably, any reference to Sudan was removed from its name, reflecting the changing politics and identity of the country, as the former Sudanese Republic became the Republic of Mali in 1960.

Modern times 
In 2013, a large fire destroyed many of the craftsmen's shops and wares in the surrounding area.

By 2015, it was run by a management committee, elected for three years and contained 89 souks and workshops for many crafts.

Commonly tourist guides will recommend a visit to the area to view the craftsmen working and to buy crafts from the market. Accordingly, it receives more than sixty thousand (60,000) tourists annually.

Notable alumni 
 Yaya Coulibaly (puppeteer)
 Habib Dembélé (actor)
 Ismael Diabate (artist)
 Amahiguere Dolo (artist)
 Habib Koité (musician)
 Abdoulaye Konaté (artist)
 Malick Sidibé (photographer)
 Salif Traoré (photographer)

References 

Education in Mali
Educational organisations based in Mali
Educational institutions established in 1933
Bamako
1933 establishments in French West Africa